Four vessels of the British Royal Navy have been named HMS Plucky:

 HMS Plucky was a 212-ton steam tender purchased in 1856 and sold in 1858.
  was a 196-ton iron-screw gunboat that was launched at Portsmouth Dockyard on 13 July 1870. Renamed  in June 1915. It was sold in 1928.
  was an  that was launched at Scotts, Greenock on 21 April 1916. It was sold for breaking up 9 May 1921, and scrapped in 1924.
  was an  that was launched at Harland and Wolff, Belfast on 29 September 1943. It arrived at Clayton & Davie, Dunston for breaking up in March 1962.

References
 

Royal Navy ship names